Meidrim is a community some  west of Carmarthen and  north of St Clears in Carmarthenshire, Wales. Meidrim (formerly also spelled 'Mydrim') and its twin village of Drefach are situated either side of the Afon Dewi Fawr at the point where this small river is crossed by the B4298 road and meets with the B4299 road.

Meidrim has a parish church, a Nonconformist chapel, a pub, a primary school, a village green or common and a park. It also boasts a number of self-catering cottages in the surrounding area making it popular for tourists visiting Pembrokeshire National Park and the Brecon Beacons as well as a number of local walks.

The name was first attested in 1612 as 'Midrim' (modern Welsh 'Meidrim') in a volume entitled 'Llyfr Plygain 1612'. As explained by the Welsh scholar Ifor Williams in his treatise on Welsh place-names (Enwau Lleoedd, 1945), it is a compound name derived from 'mei' (half, middle, cf. Latin 'medius') and the mutated form of the noun 'trum' (slope, ridge, peak, range of hills etc., Old Irish 'druimm'; cf. the Cornish place-name 'Pendrim').

The community is bordered by the communities of: Trelech; Abernant; Newchurch and Merthyr; St Clears; Llangynin; and Llanwinio, all being in Carmarthenshire.

References

External links 
Photos of Meidrim and surrounding area on geograph.org.uk

Communities in Carmarthenshire
Villages in Carmarthenshire